Robert Cleveland Johnson (May 4, 1920 – December 31, 1993) was an American actor and voice actor who played supporting roles on series television and in films from the late 1950s until a few years before his death. Johnson is probably best known as the "voice behind the scenes", who gave Special Agents Dan Briggs and Jim Phelps their recorded mission briefings on both incarnations of the Mission: Impossible television series. The "Voice" was never identified by name, title or position, and was only heard in recordings, but nevertheless became one of the most iconic features of the show.

Prior to his work on Mission: Impossible, Johnson frequently provided the voices of numerous alien creatures on The Outer Limits.  He was uncredited for all, except for his work as the alien "Senator" in the episode "Fun And Games".

He may have been involved in English-language dubbing on lesser-known Spaghetti Westerns.

Johnson was born in Portland, Oregon, and died at the age of seventy-three in Molokai, Hawaii.

References

External links

1920 births
1993 deaths
American male film actors
American male television actors
American male voice actors
Male actors from Portland, Oregon
20th-century American male actors